Yevgeny Valerianovich Samoilov (16 April 1912 in St. Petersburg – 17 February 2006 in Moscow) was a Soviet actor who gained prominence in youthful heroic parts and was named a People's Artist of the USSR in 1974. He was the father of Tatiana Samoilova.

Life 

Samoilov is not related to the famous Samoilov family that dominated the Maly Theatre in the 19th century. He was educated in Leningrad, starting his career at a local theatre. In 1934 he was noticed by Vsevolod Meyerhold who invited him to join his own troupe in Moscow. Samoilov worked with Meyerhold for four years. He got his most substantial roles in Meyerhold's theatre playing Hernani in Hugo's drama and Chatsky in Woe from Wit.

When Meyerhold was arrested and purged in 1938, Samoilov was in the middle of rehearsing for Pushkin's Boris Godunov (the role of Grigory Otrepyev) and Ostrovsky's How the Steel Was Tempered (the role of Pavka Korchagin). His acting career seemed to be unhampered, however. Samoilov's appearance as the Soviet commander Shchors in Alexander Dovzhenko's film of the same name won him the Stalin Prize for 1941. He proceeded to become an iconic film actor of the Joseph Stalin era, playing against Lyubov Orlova in Bright Path and Marina Ladynina in Six O'Clock in the Evening after the War (1944 film; 1946 Stalin Prize). One of his favourite film roles was that of General Skobelev in The Heroes of Shipka (1955).

After the Meyerhold theatre was disbanded, Samoilov moved to Nikolay Okhlopkov's Mayakovsky Theatre, where he would work until the director's death in 1967. His role of Oleg Koshevoy in the first stage version of The Young Guard won him another Stalin Prize. One of the highlights of his career was Hamlet in Okhlopkov's production of 1954. It was the first post-war production of the play in the country and led to Okhlopkov's joint work with Peter Brook. In 1961, he was cast as Jason in the first-ever Russian production of Medea by Euripides. Six years later, he appeared in the role opposite Aspasia Papathanassiou of Greece.

In 1967 Samoilov rejoined his colleagues from the Meyerhold Theatre in the Maly Theatre. The greatest success of his declining years was the role of Prince Ivan Shuisky in Tsar Fyodor Ioannovich (1973). "It was a genuine Christian man, living in Christ; I have never seen anything like this", says Georgy Sviridov, who composed music for the production. Samoilov's last film roles came in the movies directed by Sergei Bondarchuk, such as Waterloo and Boris Godunov. The actor celebrated his 90th birthday acting on the stage of the Maly Theatre in 2002.

Partial filmography

 Accidental Meeting (1936) - Grigoriy Rybin
 Tom Soyer (1936) - Doctor Robinzon
 Shchors (1939) - Nikolay Shchors
 V poiskakh radosti (1940) - Kirill Zhdarkin
 Tanya (1940) - Aleksei Nikolaevich Lebedev
 Four Hearts (1941) - Don Pablo (segment "Nebo i ad" / "Heaven and Hell")
 Invisible Jan (1942) - Jani
 Is kidev dabrundeba (1943)
 David Bek (1944) - Kasyanov
 Six P.M. (1944) - Lieutenant Vasili Ivanovich Kudryashev
 Four Hearts (1945) - First Lieutenant Pyotr Nikitich Kolchin
 Sinegoriya (1946) - Amalgama
 Admiral Nakhimov (1947) - Lt. Burunov
 Novyy dom (1947) - Captain Ivan Veshnyak
 Malchik s okrainy (1948) - Andrey Skvortsov
 Boy from the Outskirts (1948) - father of Andrey
 Sud chesti (1949) - Nikolay
 Taras Shevchenko (1951) - Nikolay Aleksandrovich Speshnev
 The Unforgettable Year 1919 (1951) - Nekhlyudov's son
 Adventure in Odessa (1953) - Nikolay Yefanov, otets Gleba
 Heroes of Shipka (1955) - Gen. Skobolov
 Krushenie emirata (1955) - M. V. Frunze
 Neokonchennaya povest (1955) - Aleksandr Aganin
 K Chyornomu moryu (1957) - Konstantin Aleksandrovich Kokhlov
 Oleko Dundich (1958) - Bodrov
 Zare navstrechu (1960) - Savych
 Bessonnaya noch (1960) - Pavel's father
 Lyudi moey doliny (1961) - Yevgeniy Burchak
 Parqi oghakner (1962) - Vasilyev
 The Alive and the Dead (1964)
 The Enchanted Desna (1964) - Colonel Aleksandr Petrovich
 Waterloo (1970) - Cambronne
 Zvyozdy ne gasnut (1971) - G.V. Chicherin
 Krusheniye imperii (1971) - Savva Abramovich Petrushin
 Dlinnaya doroga v korotkiy den (1972) - Mikhail Petrovich
 They Fought for Their Country (1975) - Marchenko
 Boris Godunov (1986) - monk Pimen
 Caccia alla vedova (1991) - Priest
 V nachale bylo slovo (1992) - Father Superior (final film role)

Honours and awards
Order of Merit for the Fatherland 3rd class
Order of Merit for the Fatherland 4th class
Order of the October Revolution
Order of the Red Banner of Labour
Medal "In Commemoration of the 850th Anniversary of Moscow"
Medal "For the Defence of Moscow"
Medal "For Valiant Labour in the Great Patriotic War 1941-1945"
Medal "Veteran of Labour"
Medal "For the Development of Virgin Lands"
Medal "In Commemoration of the 800th Anniversary of Moscow"

References

 Biography on the site of Maly Theatre
 Filmography of Evgeny Samoilov

Further reading
N. Barskaya. Ye. V. Samoilov. Moscow, 1951.

External links

1912 births
2006 deaths
Male actors from Saint Petersburg
People's Artists of the USSR
Stalin Prize winners
Soviet male actors